The Obermayer German Jewish History Awards were established in 2000 by Dr. Arthur S. Obermayer to pay tribute to non-Jewish Germans who have made outstanding voluntary contributions to preserving the memory of German Jewish communities.  These Awards recognize and encourage those who have been devoted to such activities and bring international attention to their work.  Five individuals are honored each year.

The Awards are presented annually at the Abgeordnetenhaus of Berlin, the home of the Berlin Parliament. A Distinguished Service Award, an honor bestowed upon extraordinary individuals whose accomplishments fall outside the scope of the specific award guidelines, was first awarded in 2014.

Presentations are in late January to coincide with the commemoration of International Holocaust Remembrance Day, January 27.  They are administered and supported by the Obermayer Foundation, with sponsorship, support and organization of the ceremony in Berlin by the Berlin Parliament. They are also co-sponsored by the Leo Baeck Institute (New York) and GerSIG (the German Jewish Special Interest Group of JewishGen.org).

Many Germans have raised awareness of a once-vibrant Jewish history and culture in their communities through public programs, exhibitions, widespread exposure, restoration of synagogues and cemeteries, installation of Holocaust memorials, genealogical research, development of websites, publications, and other activities.  They have forged meaningful relationships with former residents and descendants of those who once lived in their towns. They are teachers and engineers, publishers and judges, artists and bankers, lawyers and business executives, and they come from every corner of the country. These volunteers have devoted countless hours to such projects.

References

External links 
 

Award ceremonies
Jewish German history